The  was a section of the Imperial Japanese Army charged with military education and training in the army, except military aviation training. It was headed by an inspector general who was responsible for overseeing technical and tactical training, and who reported directly to the Emperor of Japan via the Imperial General Headquarters rather than to the Army Minister or the Chief of the Imperial Japanese Army General Staff Office. The position of Inspector-General of Military Training was thus the third most powerful position within the Japanese Army.

History
The office of Inspectorate General of Military Training was established 20 January 1898, to provide a unified command for the Imperial Japanese Army Academy, and the various specialized weaponry and technical training schools, and the military preparatory schools located in various locations around the country. It also had broad powers of oversight over Army logistics, transportation, and support issues. Due to its political power, the post was highly sought after by Army senior leadership, and a factional dispute over succession was one of the triggering factors of the February 26 Incident. The post was abolished with the dissolution of the Imperial Japanese Army after the surrender of Japan at the end of World War II.

Organization
Headquarters
Section 1. General Affairs (Personnel, Accounting, etc.)
Section 2. General Training
Section 3. Research and Training Regulations
Section 4. Special Schools
Artillery
Military engineering
Military logistics
Cavalry (-> Armoured warfare from 1941)
Chemical warfare (from 1941)
Military communications (from 1941)
Anti-aircraft warfare (from 1945)

Also from 1941, a 2nd Bureau was added to the organizational structure, to specialize in armored car training. However, military aviation always remained outside the jurisdiction of the Inspectorate.

List of Inspectors-General of Military Training

References

External links
Axis History Database

Imperial Japanese Army